Edmundo Madarang Abaya (19 January 1929 – 20 September 2018) was a Filipino Catholic archbishop.

Abaya was born in the Philippines and was ordained to the priesthood in 1953. He served as bishop of the Roman Catholic Diocese of Laoag, Philippines, from 1978 to 1999 and then as archbishop of the Roman Catholic Archdiocese of Nueva Segovia from 1999 to 2005.

See also

Notes

External links

1929 births
2018 deaths
People from Ilocos Sur
21st-century Roman Catholic archbishops in the Philippines
20th-century Roman Catholic archbishops in the Philippines
Filipino bishops
Roman Catholic archbishops of Nueva Segovia